Current Lake (also spelled Currant Lake) is a lake in Murray County, in the U.S. state of Minnesota.

Current Lake derives its name from the currant trees near the lake.

References

Lakes of Minnesota
Lakes of Murray County, Minnesota